The Review of Keynesian Economics (ROKE)  is a quarterly double-blind peer-reviewed academic journal covering Keynesian and Post-Keynesian economics, although it is also open to other heterodox traditions. It is published by Edward Elgar Publishing and was established in 2012. Louis-Philippe Rochon was instrumental in creating the journal, and the founding editors-in-chief Thomas Palley (New America Foundation), Louis-Philippe Rochon (Laurentian University), and Matías Vernengo (Bucknell University) developed the idea of a broad Keynesian journal, that encompassed all the different Keynesian schools of thought. Rochon is now Editor Emeritus and Esteban Pérez Caldentey (Economic Commission for Latin America and the Caribbean) is the third editor.

Abstracting and indexing 
The journal is abstracted and indexed in:
 Research Papers in Economics
 Current Contents/Social & Behavioral Sciences
 Social Sciences Citation Index
 EconLit
 Business Source Complete

References

External links 
 

Economics journals
Keynesian economics
Post-Keynesian economics
English-language journals
Publications established in 2012